The Satanic Angels is a 2007 Moroccan film, directed by Ahmed Boulane.

Synopsis 
The Satanic Angels is the story of fourteen young hard rock musicians who are arrested and sentenced to three months to one year in jail for "shaking the foundations of Islam" and "Satanism" after a surrealistic trial. Society and the media mobilize to free them.

Awards 
 Festival National du Film (Tanger, 2007)
 India International Film Festival (2007)
 Avanca Film Festival (Portugal, 2007)

References 

 

2007 films
Moroccan drama films